Brdo is a village situated in Nova Varoš municipality in Serbia.

References

Populated places in Zlatibor District